Moon Island may refer to:

 Comoros islands, an island state located in the Indian Ocean between Madagascar and Mozambique

 Moon Island (Australia), an Australian island off Swansea Heads
 Moon Island (Hong Kong)
 Moon Island (Massachusetts), U.S.
 Tsukishima (Moon Island), Chūō, Tokyo, Japan
 A community in The Archipelago, Ontario, Canada
 An island in St. Mary's River, Michigan
 The German and Swedish name for Muhu island in the Gulf of Riga
 A resort and the site of the 2004 Sinai bombings

See also
 Half Moon Island, an Antarctic island in the South Shetland Islands
 Mohn Islands, in the Kara Sea, Siberia, Russia
 Mon Island, Region Zealand, Denmark